In enzymology, a pyrroline-5-carboxylate reductase is an enzyme that catalyzes the chemical reaction

L-proline + NAD(P)+  1-pyrroline-5-carboxylate + NAD(P)H + H+

The 3 substrates of this enzyme are L-proline, NAD+, and NADP+, whereas its 4 products are 1-pyrroline-5-carboxylate, NADH, NADPH, and H+.

This enzyme belongs to the family of oxidoreductases, specifically those acting on the CH-NH group of donors with NAD+ or NADP+ as acceptor.  The systematic name of this enzyme class is L-proline:NAD(P)+ 5-oxidoreductase. Other names in common use include proline oxidase, L-proline oxidase, 1-pyrroline-5-carboxylate reductase, NADPH-L-Delta1-pyrroline carboxylic acid reductase, and L-proline-NAD(P)+ 5-oxidoreductase.  This enzyme participates in arginine and proline metabolism.

Structural studies

Human genes
 PYCR1, nuclear gene for mitochondrial protein
 PYCR2, nuclear gene for mitochondrial protein
 PYCR3 (formerly PYCRL), cytosolic protein

References

 
 
 
 

EC 1.5.1
NADPH-dependent enzymes
NADH-dependent enzymes
Enzymes of known structure